The 1929–30 Divizia A was the eighteenth season of Divizia A, the top-level football league of Romania.

Participating teams

Final Tournament of Regions

Preliminary round

1 The team from Brasov failed to appear, so it lost the game with 0–3, by administrative decision.

Quarters

Semifinals

Final
June 8, 1930, Bucharest

Champion squad

References

Liga I seasons
Romania
1929–30 in Romanian football